Rybalko is a gender-neutral Ukrainian surname that may refer to

Aida Rybalko  (born 1990), Lithuanian figure skater
Maksim Rybalko (born 1981), Russian football player
Pavel Rybalko (1892–1948), Soviet military commander
Viktoriya Rybalko (born 1982), Ukrainian long jumper

See also
 

Ukrainian-language surnames
Occupational surnames